Marcos Raya (born 1948 Guanajuato, Mexico) is a Mexican artist based out of Chicago, Illinois. He became known in the Chicago neighborhood of Pilsen for his street murals. His studio is in the Chicago community area of New City.

Early life
Born in Mexico, Raya spent the first 16 years of his life there before moving to the United States with his mother and siblings. In 1964, when Raya moved to Chicago, in the middle of the Civil rights movement of the 1960s, he found that the conditions created by the movement allowed for him to express his political sentiment through his artwork.

Career
Raya paints street murals and also creates paintings, self-portraits as well as multi-media projects. Well known throughout Pilsen for his street murals and involvement in the art community, Raya has also had his artwork seen around the world in various exhibits. "Within the last three years Raya's paintings, installations, assemblages, photographs, and painted furniture have been featured in four Latino art exhibitions that have traveled Mexico, Japan, and the U.S." Raya is gaining popularity in the art world outside of Chicago as his works have been shown in the new Museum of Contemporary Art, he has permanent collections in the National Mexican Museum in Chicago, the Museum of Contemporary Art in Chicago, the Alfred Smart Museum at the University of Chicago, the Menil Collection in Houston, the Museum of Fine Arts in Houston, and the Museum of Notre Dame in Indiana.

Much of Raya's artwork is influenced by his Mexican roots. When Raya was a child, he met Mexican street artist Jose Chavez Morado. Raya believes that his encounter with Chavez Morado helped him better understand his goals through painting. Raya remembers his encounter with Chavez Morado, who was known for creating street murals with strong political meaning, and recalls his sentiment towards him and his work, "I talked to him about how he mixed his paint and his beautiful images. Muralists were men you could talk to and relate to. They painted history and denounced war, political corruption, you name it. And they were also active politically." Influenced by his encounter with Chavez Morado, Raya moved to Chicago and enrolled at Crane High School where he met an art teacher named Jeff Gottlieb. Gottlieb got Raya interested in art, and took him on a field trip one day to the Art Institute of Chicago, where his interest in art was further piqued.  Being an immigrant from Mexico, and having moved to the United States, Raya had a mixed sense of nationality where he was old enough to remember what Mexico was like, but simultaneously be molded by American values.

The Chicano identity is important to Raya, for he identifies with his Mexican heritage as well as his American upbringing. Mexicans initially adopted the term "chicano" because it was initially used against them as a slang term, but then they later adopted it as something to be proud of. The Chicano term, which was formed under a prticualr historical context, has come to represent rebelliousness against national oppression and forced assimilation. Much of Raya's artwork contains Chicano themes, and many times he incorporates political messages in his work as well. In “Our Lady of the New Millennium” Raya pulls from the format of the powerful image of “Virgen de Guadalupe”, and in place of la virgen, is a woman that seems to be constructed of metallic pieces, dressed in scantily clad clothing. Raya draws from his Mexican heritage in order to make a political statement about money, sex, and power replacing religion in today's society. Affected by his heritage, he combines the powerful image of La virgen, and the society in which he is entrenched in today.

Throughout his time in Pilsen, Raya also struggled with alcoholism. Other members of the community were aware of his drinking situation and were there to offer him support. Many of his friends and other artists in the Pilsen area who were aware of his drinking recall stories of running into him at bars or on the street where many times they either took him home, or found him in such horrible conditions that they would take him to the hospital. Raya overcame his problem with alcoholism, and expressed his feelings towards it through his self-portrait “3 a.m. Sunday Morning” In this painting; Raya paints himself face down on a table, empty bottle of booze on the table, with a gun resting near his hand. As an example of how his artwork reflects his personal life Raya depicts himself with his “demons” floating above his unconscious body, showing the viewer exactly what he's struggling with in the rarest form possible.

Personal life
Raya still lives in the same apartment he settled in in 1980 in Pilsen, though his studio is in New City, Chicago. Having overcome his alcoholism, Raya frequently thinks about his friends who he has lost to alcoholism.

One of his more recent works "Los hijos de la mala vida" or "The Sons of the Bad Life" depicts his old drinking buddies before they died, and Raya expresses his gratefulness for having left that life behind him. Raya believes, however that his life is on the upswing, and although he is climbing in years, he is confident his art is just beginning, and he wishes to continue bettering his art.

References

Mexican artists